Xinhe Elementary School (Chinese: 新和國小站; Pinyin: Xīnhé guóxiǎo zhàn) is a light rail station of the Ankeng light rail, operated by the New Taipei Metro, in Xindian, New Taipei, Taiwan.

Station overview
The station is an elevated station with 2 side platforms. It is located on Section 3, Anhe Road, near the Xindian office of the Water Resources Agency.

Station layout

Around the station

 Water Resources Bureau Research Institute
 Xinhe Elementary School
 Xindian Yong-an Post Office Banqiao Branch 56

Bus connections
Buses 8, 202, 208, 576, 624, 897, O1, and O9 stop at this station.

History
Construction of the station started on November 7, 2014 and finished in 2022. The station opened on February 10, 2023.

See also

 Ankeng light rail
 New Taipei Metro
 Rail transport in Taiwan

References

External links
 New Taipei Metro Corporation
 New Taipei City Department of Rapid Transit

Ankeng light rail stations